An annular solar eclipse occurred on February 16, 1999. A solar eclipse occurs when the Moon passes between Earth and the Sun, thereby totally or partly obscuring the image of the Sun for a viewer on Earth. An annular solar eclipse occurs when the Moon's apparent diameter is smaller than the Sun's, blocking most of the Sun's light and causing the Sun to look like an annulus (ring). An annular eclipse appears as a partial eclipse over a region of the Earth thousands of kilometres wide. Annularity was visible in the southern Indian Ocean including the Prince Edward Islands, South Africa (the northern part of Marion Island and the whole Prince Edward Island), and Australia.

Images

Related eclipses

Eclipses of 1999 
 A penumbral lunar eclipse on January 31.
 An annular solar eclipse on February 16.
 A partial lunar eclipse on July 28.
 A total solar eclipse on August 11.

Solar eclipses 1997–2000

Saros 140 
It is a part of Saros cycle 140, repeating every 18 years, 11 days, containing 71 events. The series started with partial solar eclipse on April 16, 1512. It contains total eclipses from July 21, 1656 through November 9, 1836, hybrid eclipses from November 20, 1854 through December 23, 1908, and annular eclipses from January 3, 1927 through December 7, 2485. The series ends at member 71 as a partial eclipse on June 1, 2774. The longest duration of totality was 4 minutes, 10 seconds on August 12, 1692.

Metonic series

Notes

References

1999 2 16
1999 in science
1999 02 16
February 1999 events